The helmet cover was first used by French soldiers during World War I.

Helmet covers are usually made out of canvas or cotton and come in many camouflage designs, for example: woodland, desert or urban, and different camouflage patterns like MARPAT, CADPAT and ACUPAT. It can also be used for UN peacekeeping missions with a UN Blue colour helmet cover. White covers are sometimes used in snow regions.  Helmet covers are generally a flat colour to stop any reflection from a metal helmet. Helmet covers are attached to the helmet in many different ways, such as a tight rubber lip which goes all the way around the helmet rim and is pulled on and peeled off, draw-strings, and types which are attached to the helmet suspension system. The earliest helmet covers were retained simply by being "sandwiched" between the liner and the shell. Helmet covers help break up the helmet's distinctive silhouette and eliminate glare (especially if wet) and can muffle the sound of foliage striking or brushing the helmet.

Helmet covers are used by most armies and are in the camouflage pattern of the country/military's camouflage pattern, but some armies have different covers. For example, the Austrian Armed Forces wear several different helmet covers instead of one standardized cover. The Israeli Defense Forces use the mitznefet, a large, floppy helmet cover to break up the outline of the soldier. The US Army from 1953 to the mid-late 1980s used a dual-sided camouflage cover (one side a green leaf pattern, the other a brown and tan desert pattern) with its steel helmets while the rest of the uniform was green. The US Marine Corps adopted reversible camouflage helmet covers in late 1942. This led to the orders of "green-side out" or "brown-side out."

Another type of helmet cover is the mesh net cover, which also helps reduce the metal glare from combat helmets as well as giving an opportunity to add natural camouflage such as grass, leaves and twigs. This type of cover is however not as widely used anymore, as the modern camouflage cloth covers in various patterns are more common on modern combat helmets, and most cloth covers have cut-outs for placing foliage anyway. A common mistake is to attach too much or too long foliage which waves about when moving.

Military camouflage
Military hats